Whispering Sands (Pasir Berbisik) is a 2001 Indonesian drama film directed by Nan Triveni Achnas and starring Christine Hakim and Dian Sastrowardoyo as a mother and her teenage daughter who are refugees making their way across endless sand dunes.

Plot

Berlian and her teenage daughter Daya are on the run from political violence. Constantly daydreaming that her absent father will return, young Daya chafes under the stern hand of her mother. Forced to move inland from their seaside home to a desert of constantly shifting sands, the pair settle down to their familiar antagonism. Finally, Daya sees a vaguely familiar face shuffle in from across the wasteland.

Cast
 Christine Hakim as Berlian
 Dian Sastrowardoyo as Daya
 Slamet Rahardjo as Agus (Daya's father)
 Didi Petet as Suwito
 Charma Juinda as Sukma

Festivals and awards
The film has been screened at many film festivals worldwide. Accolades include:
 Best New Director, Cinematography and Sound: Asia Pacific Film Festival 2001
 Best Actress: Deauville Asian Film Festival 2002
 Best Actress: Singapore International Film Festival 2002
 Asian Tradewinds Special Jury Prize: Seattle International Film Festival 2002
 Special Mention from Netpac July: Brisbane International Film Festival 2002

External links
 

2001 films
2001 drama films
2000s Indonesian-language films
Films shot in Indonesia
Indonesian drama films